Ocyale may refer to:
 an alternative name for the Amazons
 Ocyale (spider), a spider genus in the family Lycosidae